The Rolls-Royce 30 hp was one of four cars to be produced as a result of an agreement of 23 December 1904 between Charles Rolls and Henry Royce. Badged as a Rolls-Royce, the 30 hp was produced during 1905 and 1906 by Royce's company, Royce Ltd. at its factory in Cooke Street, Hulme, Manchester. It was sold exclusively by Rolls' motor dealership, C.S.Rolls & Co., at a price of GBP 890. The engine was exhibited at the Paris Salon in December 1904, along with the 10 hp, 15 hp and 20 hp models.

Claude Johnson was keen that a six-cylinder model was included in the Rolls-Royce line-up as other "quality" makers, especially Napier, were adding them to their ranges. The 30 hp was discontinued when the company changed to a single model policy and launched the 40/50 (Silver Ghost).

Engine 
It is water-cooled and of 6,000 cc capacity with overhead inlet and side exhaust valves.

A single Royce carburettor is fitted. Early cars have a high-tension ignition system using pre-charged accumulators, a trembler and a coil ignition system; on later cars this is supplemented by a magneto which could be used as an alternative. As the lighting supplied uses oil for the side and tail and acetylene for the headlights, there is no other drain on the accumulators, which need to be recharged between outings. The engine speed is controlled by a governor that can be over-ridden by the pedal-controlled accelerator.

A four-speed transmission carried over from the "Light" 20 hp model is connected to the engine via a short shaft. On this transmission, third gear is direct and fourth speed an overdrive ratio. A leather-faced cone clutch is used.

Crankshaft 
The crankshaft is carried in seven main bearings in an attempt to keep vibration to a minimum, a problem on many early six-cylinder engines, as the dynamics of the layout were still not fully understood. Flywheels are fitted at both the front and rear of the crankshaft. After some early cars suffered broken crankshafts Royce modified the front flywheel to incorporate a harmonic damper which overcame the problem.

Car 
There is a transmission brake operating on a  drum fitted behind the gearbox operated by foot pedal and internal expanding  drum brakes on the back axle operated by the handbrake lever. Suspension is by semi-elliptic leaf springs on both front and rear axles with an additional crossways helper spring on the rear. The axle is located by a triangular strut linking axle and chassis and the main drive thrust is transmitted to the car by links between the ends of the axle and forward spring brackets. By this means the springs are only responsible for suspension. Artillery type wheels with wooden spokes were fitted.

Rolls-Royce did not provide the coachwork. Instead, the cars were sold in chassis form for the customer to arrange their own body supplier. Both closed and open cars were made. Of the 37 or possibly 38 cars made, three were exported to the US, one to Canada and one to Germany.

Only one car, a short wheelbase model with chassis number 26355 is known to survive.

References

 
 
 
 

30 hp
Cars introduced in 1905
1900s cars
Brass Era vehicles